The Chinese Elm cultivar Ulmus parvifolia 'Glory' is one of the early American selections, best known for its winter hardiness.

Description
'Glory' can reach heights over 13 m.

Pests and diseases
The species and its cultivars are highly resistant, but not immune, to Dutch elm disease, and unaffected by the Elm Leaf Beetle Xanthogaleruca luteola.

Cultivation
'Glory' is common in the United States. The tree featured in the elm trials conducted by Northern Arizona University at Holbrook. It is not known to have been introduced to Europe or Australasia. Hardiness: USDA zones 5b–10a.

See also 
Ulmus parvifolia

Further reading 
 Fu Likuo, Chen Chiajui & Tang Yancheng. 1998. Ulmaceae. In: Chun Woonyong & Huang Chengchiu, eds., Flora Reipublicae Popularis Sinicae 22: 334, 413.
 
 Sherman, S. L. 1987. Flavonoid Systematics of Ulmus L. in the United States. M.S. thesis. University of Georgia.
 Sherman, S. L. and D. E. Giannasi. 1988. Foliar flavonoids of Ulmus in eastern North America. Biochem. Syst. & Ecol. 16: 51–56.
 Stipes, R. J. and R. J. Campana, eds. 1981. Compendium of Elm Diseases. St. Paul.
 Stockmarr, J. 1974. SEM studies on pollen grains of North European Ulmus species. Grana 14: 103–107.
 Wheeler, E., C. A. LaPasha, and Regis B. Miller. 1988. Wood anatomy of elm (Ulmus) and hackberry (Celtis) species native to the United States. I. A. W. A. Bull., N.S. 10: 5-26.
 Wiegrefe, S. J., K. J. Sytsma, and R. P. Guries. 1994. Phylogeny of elms (Ulmus, Ulmaceae): Molecular evidence for a sectional classification. Syst. Bot. 19: 590–612.

References

External links 
 www.metrotrees.com

Chinese elm cultivar
Ulmus articles missing images
Ulmus